Jitendranath Goswami (born 18 November 1950) is an Indian scientist from Jorhat, Assam. He was the Chief Scientist of Chandrayaan-1, and was also the developer of this project. He served as a director of Physical Research Laboratory situated at Ahmadabad, Gujarat. He was also associated with Chandrayaan-2 and Mangalyaan.

Education
Goswami started his schooling in Jorhat. In 1965, he was sixth in the higher secondary examination conducted by AHSEC. Soon after, he enrolled in Cotton College to study Physics. He got his MSc  from Gauhati University and joined Tata Institute of Fundamental Research for his PhD. At this time he also worked as a post-graduate research scholar at the University of California, Berkeley. In 1978, he received his PhD degree from Gujarat University.

Research
After his PhD, Goswami worked as a research scientist in many prestigious institutes, including UC Berkeley, Washington University, Lunar and Planetary Institute and the Max Planck Institute. The main focus of his research is study of Solar System and Astrophysics. He and his associates have proven that the main source of energy for our solar system at the time of its origin was 26Al nuclide in its half life. He has also worked on Cosmic Rays, Tectonic Plates and concluded many theories. At the Physical Research Laboratory, he served as a scientist on exploration projects including ISRO at its preliminary state. He was an associate scientist of Cosmic Ray experiment and chief scientist of Lunar Samples at spacecraft Spacelab-3. He also served on the Physical Sciences jury for the Infosys Prize from 2016 to 2018.

Awards 
 Youth Scientist Award by Indian National Science Association (1978) 
 NASA's Public Service Group of Achievement Award (1986)
 Shanti Swaroop Bhatnagar Award (1994)
 Kamal Kumari National Award for science and technology (2003) 
 Axford award by Asia Oceania Geoscience Society (2014) 
 Asom Ratna (2015), highest civilian award of Government of Assam
 Padma Shri, 2017 by Government of India.

Goswami was elected president of the Astronomical Society of India in 2007. He is a member of The World Academy of Science, Indian Academy of Sciences, European Association of Geochemistry and many other national and international astronomy associations.

References

External links 
 website of Chandrayaan 
 Interview with BBC of Dr. Goswami 
 About Mangalyaan 
 Interview on Mangalyaan at BBC World Service with Dr. Goswami
 

1950 births
Living people
People from Jorhat district
Scientists from Assam
Cotton College, Guwahati alumni
Indian Space Research Organisation people
20th-century Indian physicists
Recipients of the Padma Shri in science & engineering
Recipients of the Shanti Swarup Bhatnagar Award in Earth, Atmosphere, Ocean & Planetary Sciences